Qeshlaq-e Tak Quyi Matlab va Ali Khan (also Romanized as Qeshlāq-e Tak Qūyī Maṭlab va ʿAlī Khān) is a village in Qeshlaq-e Gharbi Rural District, Aslan Duz District, Parsabad County, Ardabil Province, Iran. At the 2006 census, its population was 99, in 16 families.

References 

Towns and villages in Parsabad County